Vose District is a district in Khatlon Region, Tajikistan. Its capital is the town Hulbuk (former name: Vose). The population of the district is 216,500 (January 2020 estimate).

Administrative divisions
They are as follows:

References

Districts of Khatlon Region
Districts of Tajikistan